Nick Crittenden may refer to:

 Nick Crittenden (writer), screenwriter and researcher
 Nick Crittenden, British soccer player